Grassholm is an island  south of Frida Hole, along the south coast and near the west end of South Georgia in the South Atlantic ocean. The name "Em Island" was given for this feature, probably by Discovery Investigations personnel who surveyed this coast in 1926.

The South Georgia Survey (1951–52) reported that this feature is known to whalers and sealers as "Grassholmen," and that Em Island is unknown locally. The indefinite form of the name has been approved (without the suffix -en, which denotes the definite article in North Germanic languages).

See also
 List of Antarctic islands north of 60° S

References

Islands of South Georgia